May Food Keep Us Together (Chinese: 飲食男女) is a television documentary series on food and people in Hong Kong.  The first season contains 52 self-contained episodes, each of which tells the story of a restaurant or eatery.

Synopsis

May food Keep Us Together is a documentary series that captures the lives of ordinary people who cook and serve food as a profession in Hong Kong.  There is no celebrity chefs, presenters or voice-over in the series.  Through their own voices and accounts, every episode tells a story of these men and women within and beyond the walls of the kitchen.

Apart from telling the human story of these food heroes, the series is also a collection of Hong Kong cuisine. The distinct food culture of Hong Kong is illustrated in the programs.(e.g. Dai Pai Dong, eating dim sum as breakfast, dining together as the ties of family, etc.).

Production Team

May food Keep Us Together is a production of Peoples Production Limited, a wholly owned subsidiary of the Next Media Limited.

Episodes
There are a total of 52 half-hour (24 minutes) episodes in the first season. The following table summarises the cuisines featured.

Season 1

Awards and nominations

17th Asian Television Awards 2012, Singapore 

48th Chicago Intercom Competition 2012 

2012 Accolade Competition, USA

33rd Annual Telly Awards 2012 

47th Chicago Intercom Competition 2011 

16th Asian Television Awards 2011, Singapore

Broadcasting
May Food Keep Us Together was premiered on Next TV in Taiwan on 4 June 2011. Subsequently, the series has been broadcast in San Francisco, Hong Kong, Malaysia and Singapore.

References

External links
 Official website
 Peoples Production Limited
 Peoples Production Youtube Channel

 

Chinese documentary television series
2011 Hong Kong television series debuts
2010s Hong Kong television series